This is a list of 105 species in Stichopogon, a genus of robber flies in the family Asilidae.

Stichopogon species

 Stichopogon abdominalis Back, 1909 i c g b
 Stichopogon aedon (Walker, 1849) c g
 Stichopogon aequetinctus Becker, 1910 c g
 Stichopogon agustifrons Theodor, 1980 c g
 Stichopogon albellus Loew, 1856 c g
 Stichopogon albimystax Joseph & Parui, 1988 c g
 Stichopogon albofasciatus (Meigen, 1820) c g
 Stichopogon ammophilus Lehr, 1975 c g
 Stichopogon angustifrons Theodor, 1980 c g
 Stichopogon araxicola Richter, 1979 c g
 Stichopogon arenicolus Wilcox, 1936 i c g
 Stichopogon argenteus (Say, 1823) i c g b
 Stichopogon auctus Bezzi, 1912 c g
 Stichopogon aurigerum Lehr, 1984 c g
 Stichopogon auritinctus Abbassian-Lintzen, 1964 c g
 Stichopogon bancrofti Hardy, 1934 c g
 Stichopogon barbiellinii Bezzi, 1910 c g
 Stichopogon barbistrellus Loew, 1854 c g
 Stichopogon basiti Joseph & Parui, 1993 c g
 Stichopogon beckeri Bezzi, 1910 c g
 Stichopogon bedae Hradsky & Geller-Grimm, 1996 c g
 Stichopogon biharilali Joseph & Parui, 1993 c g
 Stichopogon caffer Hermann, 1907 c g
 Stichopogon californica Barnes, 2013
 Stichopogon callidus Richter, 1966 c g
 Stichopogon canariensis Becker, 1908 c g
 Stichopogon candidus Becker, 1902 c g
 Stichopogon canus Seguy, 1932 c g
 Stichopogon catulus Osten Sacken, 1887 i c g b
 Stichopogon caucasicus Bezzi, 1910 c g
 Stichopogon chrysostoma Schiner, 1867 c g
 Stichopogon colei Bromley, 1934 i c g b
 Stichopogon conjungens Bezzi, 1910 c g
 Stichopogon coquillettii (Bezzi, 1910) i c g
 Stichopogon deserti Theodor, 1980 c g
 Stichopogon dorsatus Becker, 1915 c g
 Stichopogon dubiosus Villeneuve, 1920 c g
 Stichopogon elegantulus (Wiedemann, 1820) c g
 Stichopogon engeli Lindner, 1973 c g
 Stichopogon flaviventris Efflatoun, 1937 c g
 Stichopogon fragilis Back, 1909 i c g b
 Stichopogon gracilifemur Nagatomi, 1983 c g
 Stichopogon gussakovskii Lehr, 1975 c g
 Stichopogon gymnurus Oldroyd, 1948 c g
 Stichopogon hermanni Bezzi, 1910 c g
 Stichopogon inaequalis (Loew, 1847) c g
 Stichopogon inconstana (Wiedemann, 1828) c g
 Stichopogon indicus Joseph & Parui, 1984 c g
 Stichopogon infuscatus Bezzi, 1910 c g
 Stichopogon irwini Londt, 1979 c g
 Stichopogon kerteszi Bezzi, 1910 c g
 Stichopogon kerzhmeri Lehr, 1975 c g
 Stichopogon krueperi Bezzi, 1910 c g
 Stichopogon maculipennis Engel & Cuthbertson, 1939 c g
 Stichopogon mahatoi Joseph & Parui, 1999 c g
 Stichopogon malkovskii (Lehr, 1964) c
 Stichopogon marinus Efflatoun, 1937 c g
 Stichopogon maritima (Hardy, 1934) c g
 Stichopogon maroccanus (Becker, 1913) c g
 Stichopogon meridionalis Oldroyd, 1948 c g
 Stichopogon minor Hardy, 1934 c g
 Stichopogon mitjaevi Lehr, 1975 c g
 Stichopogon modestus Lehr, 1975 c g
 Stichopogon moremiensis Londt, 1979 c g
 Stichopogon mukherjeei Joseph & Parui, 1999 c g
 Stichopogon muticus Bezzi, 1910 c g
 Stichopogon nartshuakae Lehr, 1975 c g
 Stichopogon nartshukae Lehr g
 Stichopogon nigritus (Paramonov, 1930) c g
 Stichopogon obscurellus Lehr, 1975 c g
 Stichopogon obscurus (Hardy, 1928) c g
 Stichopogon ocrealis (Rondani, 1863) c g
 Stichopogon oldroydi Joseph & Parui, 1993 c g
 Stichopogon orientalis Lehr, 1975 c g
 Stichopogon parvipulvillatus Lehr, 1975 c g
 Stichopogon parvulus (Bigot, 1859) c
 Stichopogon peregrinus Osten Sacken, 1882 c g
 Stichopogon pholipteron Richter, 1973 c g
 Stichopogon pritchardi Bromley, 1951 i c g
 Stichopogon punctiferus Bigot, 1878 c g
 Stichopogon punctus Loew, 1851 c g
 Stichopogon pusio (Macquart, 1849) c g
 Stichopogon pygmaeus (Macquart, 1849) c g
 Stichopogon ramakrishnai Joseph & Parui, 1988 c g
 Stichopogon rivulorum Lehr, 1975 c g
 Stichopogon rubzovi Lehr, 1975 c g
 Stichopogon salinus (Melander, 1924) i c g
 Stichopogon scaliger Loew, 1847 c g
 Stichopogon schineri Koch, 1872 c g
 Stichopogon schnusei (Bezzi, 1910) c g
 Stichopogon selenginus Lehr, 1984 c g
 Stichopogon septemcinctus Becker, 1908 c g
 Stichopogon sogdianus Lehr, 1975 c g
 Stichopogon stackelbergi Lehr, 1975 c g
 Stichopogon surcoufi Villeneuve, 1920 c g
 Stichopogon tomentosus Oldroyd, 1948 c g
 Stichopogon tridactylophagus Lehr, 1975 c g
 Stichopogon trifasciatus (Say, 1823) i c g b  (three-banded robber fly)
 Stichopogon umkomaasensis Oldroyd, 1974 c g
 Stichopogon unicolor Ricardo, 1925 c g
 Stichopogon variabilis Lehr, 1975 c g
 Stichopogon venezuelanus Kaletta, 1976 c g
 Stichopogon venustus Richter, 1963 c g
 Stichopogon vernaculus (White, 1918) c g
 Stichopogon villiersi Seguy, 1955 c g

Data sources: i = ITIS, c = Catalogue of Life, g = GBIF, b = Bugguide.net

References

Stichopogon